The Lords of Chaos and Order are a complementary group of fictional supernatural entities appearing in American comic books published by DC Comics. While alluded to since 1st Issue Special #9 (December, 1975), the group would make their first physical appearance in DC Special Series #10 (1978). While the group is commonly associated with Doctor Fate titles, they also appear prominently in other comic titles. Depicted as powerful beings of magic representing concepts of order and chaos, both groups eternally struggle for supremacy. The Lords of Chaos are plotting to invoke kali yuga (a period where chaos dominates existence) while the Lords of Order work to prevent it. Both groups are also sometimes depicted as being balanced by entities known the Balancers (also referred to as the  Lords of Eternal Balance), disallowing both sides from destroying each other. All sides can empower agents to act on their behest.

The group has been adapted in media, having made appearances in the Young Justice animated series, featuring a roster of members consisting of different and pre-existing characters in the DC Universe serving as members or affiliates. The group is also mentioned heavily in the Injustice 2.

Publication history
The Lords of Chaos and Order would first be alluded to in 1st Issue Special #9 (December, 1975). Later, the group would make a physical appearance in DC Special Series #10 (1978).

Fictional group history

Creation 
Both elemental forces were born during the creation of the universe; those who affiliated with serving "order" are known as the Lord of Order and Light (or simply the Lords of Order) and those who affiliated with serving "chaos" being known as the Lords of Chaos and Darkness (or simply Lords of Chaos). Some respective early agents and lords originate from a myriad of places, including Darkworld and Cilia, the former being home to those who would later identify with the pantheon of ancient Atlantean deities. According to Hindu philosophy, the age of the universe and mankind is divided into four different cycles of ages in which the first age marks order ruling with perfection. In the second age, chaos begins to spread its subtle influence so that in the third age, chaos can go to war with order. In the final era, chaos triumphs and ushers in an age known as the "Kali Yuga". After this age, the cycle restarts when the age ends and the universe itself also ends, resulting in a rebirth of a new universe in which Order rules once more.

Pre-history 
In 500,000 BC, long after the agents and Lords of Chaos and Order from Darkworld established themselves as a pantheon existing within Atlantis, demigods Arion and Garn Daanuth were born to Calculha and Dark Majistra, agents of order and chaos respectively. The pair would later create the Zodiac Crystals, powerful objects patterened after the zodiac signs in which directed and amplified the magic on Earth. With the pair suffering martial problems due to their conflicting divine natures and their children prophesied to eternally battle for the fate of Atlantis and end the Ice Age (caused by their family feud). Arion and Garn would eventually fulfill the prophecy thousands of years later around 45,000BC with Arion recognized as Atlantis's savior when he ended the Ice Age with his sorcerous powers. Despite this, Arion was unable to ultimately save his iteration of Atlantis as its king in his later years, his city eventually suffering a decline due to a combination of events: the waning magic on Earth, Garn's alliance with the immortal Vandal Savage creating the proto-Illuminati, and its actual destruction by the Lord of Chaos and God of Evil, Chaon. Although the homo magi kingdom in which Arion ruled was destroyed, contrary to his belief, other remnants of Atlantis survived.

Later, dimension known as Gemworld was once among the domains controlled and owned by the Lords of Chaos until a deal was struck with sorceress Citrina when magic began to drop on the planet Earth due to an alignment of the stars that was caused by one of them going nova thousands of years ago. Intending to find and populate a land where homo magi, faeirie, and other magical creatures alike can live and thrive in a magical rich environment, the deal was made and the arrangement was kept secret from the history of Gemworld.

Modern age 
In the 2005 Day of Vengeance crossover, Eclipso seduces the Spectre into slaughtering most of Earth's magic users after she claimed that magic was the source of all of Earth's evil. Nabu organizes a team of magical beings to stop the Spectre and seal the Seven Deadly Sins. Nabu confronts the Spectre, and the Presence (a Lord of Chaos) uses Spectre as a new host. Although Nabu dies, his helmet is left with its significant powers. The deaths of the Lords of Order and Chaos caused magic to break down into its basic raw state, which marks the end of the Ninth Age of Magic within the DC Universe, and the beginning of the Tenth. Amethyst and Mordru are the only known Lords to have survived into the Tenth Age.

DC Rebirth 
In DC Rebirth, the Lords of Chaos and Order are presented with a new origin; being among the first mages on Earth, the group of mages plot and were successful in stealing magical power from the Greek Goddess of Magic, Hecate. Unlike the classical Greek mythology stories, Hecate was a primordial spirit of magic and predates most, if not, all other godly pantheons and once settled to be affiliated with the Greek pantheon. As their power rose, they ascended to a higher plane of existence and became the Lords of Chaos and Order and began controlling the magic in the known universe. However, conflicting origins have risen within DC's canonical universe; while some stories utilize the newly revised origin, other stories utilize an origin similar to the previous one. In this origin, the Lords of Chaos and Order was created from the Source as one of the first cosmic forces in the universe before the likes of both Old Gods (gods of both fantasy and real-world inspired pantheons) and New Gods. The Darkworld also exists in this revised universe, the entity and its body that makes up the dimension having been explained to be a piece of the Great Darkness, the true embodiment and source of evil and darkness in the universe.

Severan Lords of Order appear in the "Hard Choices" Blue Beetle storyline, insane Arion battled Nabu thousands of years ago, having sought Khaji-Da to save Atlantis after receiving a vision from the future where he learns of the eventual destruction of Atlantis and the scarab falsely promised him the ability to save it. Nabu succeeds in sealing away Arion and sets him in a tomb located in a dimension parallel to what would be El Paso, Texas.  Arion later frees himself through his lackey, Mordecai Cull, and he is initially successful in defeating Doctor Fate and overpowering Khaji-Da's will, Jaime Reyes narrowly defeats Arion by using his connection to the scarab against him, draining him of most of his magical power before Doctor Fate arrives and seals him away. Although the initial story claimed that Arion was driven insane by exposure to Khaji-Da centuries ago, a later story clarified Arion was driven mad from being exposed to his Tear of Extinction and the Death Force as a side effect of using it against alien sea gods on Poseidon's behest.

Both the Lords of Order and Chaos would make an appearance in the "Trials of Harley Quinn" storyline, seeking a new agent to act as a galactic angel of retribution, a title bestowed to a being to act as one of the balancing agents between order and chaos and tasked Mirand'r (the spirit of a dead Tamaranean from seventy years ago) to fill the position.  She recommends the former supervillain, Harley Quinn, as she possesses traits associated with both order and chaos. While Harley eventually passes through all the trials, she betrays the Lords of Chaos andOrder moments after receiving their power after mistakenly concluding her mother's death was among the trials they orchestrated. The Lord of Order and Chaos representatives explain that their trials are woven into events naturally occurring and thus her mother was destined to die. While Harley ultimate rejects the position, she appeals to the Lords of Chaos and Order by recommending Mirand'r, who understood the role. The Lords of Chaos and Order accepted her proposition and revived Mirand'r, making her an agent of balance.

In the "Lords of Order" Justice League Dark storyline, when the Source Wall at the edge of the universe cracked, the law and forces surrounding magic began to change, Nabu sensed the risks it would bring: a race of magical beings known the Otherkind would be unleashed from this catastrophic event. Nabu alongside the other Lords of Order plot to destroy the Sphere of the Gods, the source of magic. While this act would kill all magical beings, this radical plan would ensure the Multiverse's continual survival with many Lords of Order content with this plan. In doing so, they forced upon mystical objects to notable wizards and sorceresses including Madame Xanadu, Mark Merlin and Prince Ra-Man, and Extraño. Controlling Kent Nelson himself, Nabu would imprison both Kent's apprentice and nephew, Khalid Nassour, and later the Phantom Stranger. Coming into conflict with the Justice League Dark, the team sought out Mordru, who revealed more of their origin and his role as the one who tortured Hecate personally. Using an artifact known as the Ruby of Life, he would temporarily turn the members of Justice League Dark into Lords of Chaos to enable them to battle the Lords of Order. Eventually, both Nabu and the other Lords of Order are defeated and the team reverts to their original form.

Members

Aquaman-related titles 
The fictional godly Atlantean pantheon (different from the sect of Atlantean gods appearing in the Aquaman: The Atlantic Chronicles) featured prominently in both Arion, Lord of Atlantis and Arion the Immortal comic series as villains and supporting characters. With the first series originally set within its own world connected to the Warlord comic title, the Crisis on Infinite Earths merged the history of Arion, Lord of Atlantis with the mainstream DC Comics history onward. Originally, despite similarities in concept and titles, it was explained in 1991 by editor James Owsley that many of the gods present in both series weren't considered the same as those that would be featured prominently in the Doctor Fate and Sandman in a proposal for what would be the Arion the Immortal series. However, more recent reference books and storylines (such as the "Princes of Darkness" JSA storyline & Encyclopedia: All-New Edition) outright references Lords and Agents of Order and Chaos originating from the series.

Amethyst-related titles

Doctor Fate-related titles

Hawk and Dove-related titles

Justice League Dark titles 
In the Justice League Dark (volume 2), several new Lord Of Order characters debut with a new origin for the group, casting them as among the first mages to have appeared on Earth who ascended to their positions through callous acts of torture towards Hecate, the primordial spirit of magic. In retaliation, she granted them the power they sought through the Dark Multiverse, a source of darkness and evil. Due to the magic's corrosive nature, the Lords abandoned their bodies into enchanted objects similar to the Helmet of Fate. This group (along with Nabu) were notably the main antagonist in the 2016 Justice League Dark: Lords of Order storyline as they and Nabu took to their plans to destroy the Sphere of the Gods, a source of magic, and sacrifice all magic and magic beings to starve off the fictional race known as the Otherkind, supernatural creatures who prey upon other creatures and beings carrying magic by draining them of it for nourishment, craving the belief of stability the realm of magic brings, to enforce order and balance in the new world without magic as a chaotic catalyst.

Sandman-related titles

Other related members

In other media

Film
 Nabu appears briefly in Suicide Squad: Hell to Pay. He is shown in flashbacks featuring Steel Maxum as Doctor Fate, first in the beginning of the flashbacks on which the helmet bonded with him, then, in the end of the flashbacks, on which he, upset with Maxum failing to protect the "Get Out of Hell Free" card from Scandal Savage and Knockout, kicked Maxum out of the Tower of Nabu and stripped him of his Doctor Fate title.

Television
 The Lords of Chaos and the Lords of Order appear in the Batman: The Brave and the Bold episode "The Fate of Equinox!" with Typhon voiced by John DiMaggio and Nabu by James Arnold Taylor. Batman and Doctor Fate appear before them in order to learn the history of Equinox. In addition, the character "Equinox" is revealed to be a balancer between order and chaos.
 The Lords of Chaos and Order are both featured in the Young Justice television series: 
 Nabu first debuts in the episode "Denial", voiced by Kevin Michael Richardson. A flashback in the third season episode "Evolution" featured a new origin for the character, revealing that Nabu was originally the son of Vandal Savage (who was known by the name "Marduk" during the ancient Babylonia time period). The episode "Teg Ydaer!" featured this version's origin story: during his mortal life, Nabu was once on his father's side until he was killed when Klarion unleashed Starro the Conqueror to improve Marduk's army and the army fell sway to Starro. After the death of Arion, the Lords of Order sought a method to combat the Lord of Chaos as their conflict and sinking of Atlantis escalated their battle to a new level. Seeing Nabu as a worthy candidate, they took his human soul and elevated him into a higher plane among them, binding his soul and power into the helmet he created during his lifetime. 
 Klarion the Witch Boy made his first physical debut in the episode "Denial", voiced by Thom Adcox-Hernandez. He is first referenced to as a Lord of Chaos years prior to his comic book incarnation. His powers are bound by his pet demonic cat, Teekyl, who acts as his anchor to reality. As a Lord of Chaos, Klarion's entire existence is dedicated to destroying order and making the world descend into chaos. To this end, he partners up with Vandal Savage and acts as a member of the Light. In season 4, after a millennia of him being active on Earth, Klarion falls out of favour with his fellow Chaos Lords and sends Child to dispose of him and reinvigorate their chaotic cause on Earth.
 Child appears in the fourth season, voiced by Erika Ishii. Unlike the comic's version, Child is instead a female and the servant, Flaw, is created from a gemstone known as the "Star of Atlantis". After Klarion falls out of favor with his fellow Chaos Lords, Child is sent to decorporealize Klarion and replace him. 
 Arion also appears in flashbacks in the fourth season with an origin and position, unlike the comics. Arion's Young Justice version is a metahuman, grandson of Vandal Savage (thereby making him and Nabu relatives), and is responsible for the evolution and advancement of Atlantis. Arion was chosen as the first "agent of order", a mortal human who serve as emissaries of the Lords of Order, on Earth due to the Lords of Order believing a mortal agent would better understand the chaos created on Earth. His bloodline is the progenitor for both the Homo Magi and Homo Mermanus, the former being a bloodline of metahumans capable of using magic and the latter being descendants of surviving Homo Magi when Atlantis was sunk by the Lords of Chaos. He is killed while defending Atlantis from sinking, having only inherited Vandal Savage's longevity and not his healing abilities.

Video games
 In Injustice 2, the Lords of Order have decided that humanity is capable of only chaos and aid Brainiac in his campaign to conquer Earth, forcing Doctor Fate to do his bidding. As a result, Kent Nelson finds himself being controlled by Nabu forcing his friends Black Canary and Green Arrow to defeat Doctor Fate and remove his helmet, though Kent is freed from Nabu's influence for the time being he leaves to speak to his masters, warning the pair of the coming threat. Kent tries to reason with Nabu when he forbids him from aiding innocent people, causing Nabu to reveal that the Lords of Order support Brainiac's attack on Earth due to the chaos caused by the conflicts between the Regime and the Insurgency. Batman and Superman later free Kent Nelson after defeating Doctor Fate on Brainiac's ship and Superman destroys his helmet, freeing Kent who is killed by Brainiac. In Doctor Fate's ending, he defies the Lords of Order and defeats Brainiac, but is forced to go into hiding with the help of his Justice League Dark teammates and is happily reunited with his wife. In Raiden's ending, Raiden assists Batman in defeating Brainiac but after the battle, he finds he is unable to save Kent's life. Before dying, Kent reveals that the Lords of Order are responsible for the impending Armageddon conflict as they are intent to use it to create a more orderly multiverse. To oppose the Lords of Order and restore balance, Raiden joins forces with Justice League Dark to combat them. Various names of the Lords of Order are also mentioned in Nabu's gear, including Arion, Gemimn, Jheryl, Deedra, T'Charr, and Terataya.

References

Mythology in DC Comics
DC Comics aliens
DC Comics deities